Scouting in Tokelau comes under the administration of Scouting New Zealand, continuing the arrangement from before the Tokelau became a self-governing dependency of New Zealand.

See also

External links

 
Overseas branches of Scouting and Guiding associations